"Antes de Você" is a single by Titãs, released on May 7, 2009. It is composed and sung by Paulo Miklos.

Regarding the song, he stated the following:

The song was used in the Rede Globo's telenovela Caras & Bocas (Faces & Mouths), as the character Vicente's theme.

Music video 

A music video for the single was shot on June 3, 2009, under Santa Ifigênia Bridge in downtown São Paulo. The video features the band performing there, surrounded by dozens of people wearing plastic bags (with various kinds of faces painted on them, including a copy of the head displayed at Cabeça Dinossauro's cover) on their heads (a reference to the album title, translated as "plastic bags"). During the guitar solo by Bellotto, fans "accompanied" him by "playing" air guitar.

Personnel 
 Paulo Miklos - Lead vocals, backing vocals and lead guitar
 Branco Mello - Bass guitar
 Tony Bellotto - Rhythm guitar
 Sérgio Britto - Keyboards
 Charles Gavin - Drums
 Rick Bonadio - Programming, keyboards, electric guitar and acoustic guitar

References

External links 
 "Antes de Você" video at Titãs' official YouTube channel

2009 singles
Titãs songs
2009 songs
Songs written by Paulo Miklos